The Michigan Test of English Language Proficiency (MTELP Series) is used by institutions to measure the achievement and progress of English language learners within a language program. It is produced by CaMLA, a not-for-profit collaboration between the University of Michigan and the University of Cambridge.

The MTELP Series is available at three levels, Level 1 (beginner), Level 2 (intermediate) and Level 3 (advanced). It tests the following key skills: listening comprehension, reading comprehension, grammatical knowledge and vocabulary range. It is suitable for adults or young adult learners and can be taken on either a computer or on paper.

Test format

The MTELP Series is available at three levels: Level 1 (beginner), Level 2 (intermediate) and Level 3 (advanced).

Each level of the test has three forms of the test (Forms A, B and C), which are parallel in difficulty. Each form has unique content— no questions are shared across the different forms.

The forms, at each level, use the same test format:
 The test lasts 50 minutes
 There are 60 questions.

Since May 2015, the MTELP Series has been available in both computer-based and paper-based format.  The computer-based test contains exactly the same items, in exactly the same order, as the paper-based test.

Level 1

MTELP Series Level 1 has the following test sections:

Level 2

MTELP Series Level 2 has the following test sections:

Level 3

MTELP Series Level 3 has the following test sections:

Scoring

In the computer-based test, results are available instantly as soon as the test is completed.

In the paper-based test, the institution scores the test using the provided scoring template. Institutions can administer the test, calculate scores and report back to test takers within one day.

Test takers receive a scaled score between 0–100. If the test taker receives a score that indicates that the test is too difficult or too easy for them, the institution should consider using a different MTELP level.

CaMLA recommends that Level 3 is used only with high proficiency students, otherwise the test taker's score might be so low as to be uninterpretable. Low proficiency students should probably take only Level 1 if institutions want interpretable information about the test taker's language proficiency.

Usage

MTELP Series is used as a progress test and exit (achievement) test by many different types of institutions. This includes ESL/EFL Schools, intensive English programs at colleges and universities, government agencies, and private corporations. Examples include: Andrews University,  Cambridge College,  and New America College.

Institutions that use the CaMLA English Placement Test (EPT) to place learners in level-appropriate classes may then measure the learner's progress during the course using the MTELP Series tests, which provide test items at more focused levels.

The table below shows which level of MTELP Series is most appropriate for a learner based on their CaMLA EPT score.

Preparation

CaMLA provides free sample test questions for MTELP Series Level 1, Level 2 and Level 3.

See also
 CaMLA 
 CaMLA English Placement Test (EPT)
 Examination for the Certificate of Competency in English (ECCE) 
 Examination for the Certificate of Proficiency in English (ECPE) 
 Michigan English Language Assessment Battery (MELAB) 
 Michigan English Test (MET) 
 Young Learners Tests of English (YLTE) 
 Cambridge English Language Assessment 
 English as a Foreign or Second Language

External links
 Official website

References

ESOL
CaMLA assessments
English-language education
English as a second or foreign language
Standardized tests